WDXQ (1440 AM) is a radio station licensed to Cochran, Georgia, United States. The station is currently owned by Bill Shanks, through licensee Shanks Broadcasting, LLC. The station's programming is duplicated by FM translator W244CL, operating at 96.7 MHz.

History
The station went on the air as WDXQ on March 15, 2005. On July 19, 2007, the station changed its call sign to WDCO, and again on January 15, 2010, to WDXQ.

On November 26, 2019, WDXQ changed their format from hot adult contemporary to classic country, branded as "96 Country".

References

External links

DXQ